Tara Stevens (born 10 September 1972) is a British journalist of Welsh extraction, based in Barcelona and specializing in cuisine.

Life
Tara Stevens' work focuses on the journalism of cuisine, and is regarded as especially important in terms of both the subtly and depth of its observation. She has been a regular contributor for the English-speaking Barcelona Metropolitan magazine; co-authored the Insight Guide Barcelona Smart Guide; contributed to Suzanne Wales' guide book, Night+Day Barcelona., and contributed to National Geographic Travel and Cultures Traveler magazine.

Stevens has published widely, and in September 2010 her cookbook Clock Book: Recipes from a Modern Moroccan Kitchen was released.  She is thought to be currently working on a book concerned with the dark side of cuisine.

References

1972 births
Living people
British journalists